Mohammed Shibh Al-Mashaikhi commonly known as Mohammed Al-Mashaikhi (born 4 February 1981) is an Omani footballer who plays for Sur SC in Oman Professional League.

Club career statistics

International career
Mohammed was selected for the national team for the first time in 2008. He has made three appearances in the 2010 FIFA World Cup qualification.

Honours

Club
With Al-Nahda
Omani League (2): 2006-07, 2008-09; Runner-up 2005-06
Sultan Qaboos Cup (0): Runner-up 2008, 2012
Oman Super Cup (2): 2009, 2014

References

External links

Mohammed Al-Mashaikhi - GOAL.com
Mohammed Al-Mashaikhi - FootballDatabase.eu
Mohammed Al-Mashaikhi - GOALZZ.com
Mohammed Al-Mashaikhi - KOOORA.com

1981 births
Living people
People from Abu Dhabi
Omani footballers
Oman international footballers
Association football midfielders
Al-Nasr SC (Salalah) players
Al-Nahda Club (Oman) players
Al-Shabab SC (Seeb) players
Sur SC players
Oman Professional League players